Carl Kahler, also Karl Kahler (12 September 1856 – 18 April 1906), was an Austrian  genre and animal painter, particularly known for his paintings of cats.

Life 
Kahler was born in Linz. From 19 October 1874 he studied at the Academy of Fine Arts, Munich, with Ludwig von Löfftz and Wilhelm Lindenschmit the Younger. After the end of his studies at the Academy, he spent some time studying in Paris, before settling in Munich.

Between 1881 and 1888 he exhibited his works in Berlin, Munich and Vienna. In 1885 he emigrated to Australia, and worked until 1890 in Melbourne, where he painted three pictures of the Melbourne Cup. In one of these paintings, The Betting Ring, every person in the crowd is an individual portrait.

He later emigrated to the United States. In 1891, commissioned by Kate Birdsall Johnson, he painted the picture My Wife's Lovers depicting 42 cats, which became extremely well known as a published print. From the time of this work he became increasingly known for his paintings of cats.

Kahler died aged 49 years in the 1906 San Francisco earthquake.

Selected works 
 Die Theaterloge (Die Königin der Saison), 1881
 Odaliske, 1882
 Zwei Damen mit Hund
 The Betting Ring
 The Cup Day, 1887
 The Derby Day, 1887
 My Wife's Lovers, 1891 (oil on canvas, 177.8 × 258.4 cm)

Sources 
 
 
 Alan McCulloch: Encyclopedia of Australian Art. 2nd edition. Hutchinson, Richmond, Victoria 1969, p. 301

External links 
 Matriculation Register of the Akademie München 

 Carl Kahler's Cats

Notes and references 

1856 births
1906 deaths
Austrian genre painters
Animal painters
Artists from Linz
Deaths in earthquakes
Cat artists
1906 San Francisco earthquake